John Hodgkinson (born 21 June 1966) is an English actor. He is known predominantly for his stage work with the Royal Shakespeare Company and for his performance as Tom Kettle in The Ferryman, for which he has been nominated as Best Actor in a Supporting Role in the 2018 Laurence Olivier Awards. In 2011, he was named The Journal's Performing Artist of the Year for the part of Chris Mullin in Michael Chaplin's A Walk on Part with the Live Theatre Company.

Early life
Hodgkinson was born in Surbiton, Greater London. He attended the Webber Douglas Academy of Dramatic Art.

Filmography

Film
 Firelight (1997) – Carlo
 Thunderpants (2002) – Launch Controller 1
 Skyfall (2012) – Silva's Isolation guard
 Leave to Remain (2013) – Judge
 Heart of Lightness (2014) – Jason Malvern

Television
 Inside Victor Lewis-Smith (1993–95) – 'BBC suit' 1
 Sometime, Never (1996) – Kev
 Dad (1997)
 Keeping Mum (1998) – Geoffrey
 Duck Patrol (1998) – Gareth
 Boyz Unlimited (1999) – Steve Peebles
 People Like Us (1999)
 Pure Wickedness (1999) – Colin
 The Peter Principle (2000) – Mike Cooper
 Chambers (2000) – Guy
 Holby City (2001) – Terry Thomson
 Doctors (2001) – Robert Shields
 The Bill (2001) – Mark Pinney
 Lee Evans - So What Now? (2001) – Raymond
 The Estate Agents (2002) – Death Row Client
 EastEnders (2004) – Bowers
 Peep Show (2003–04) – Tony
 My Family (2004) – Registrar / Vicar
 Broken News (2005) – Reporter in the Sea
 Doctors (2005) – Timothy Lutterworth
 Heartbeat (2007) – Brian Rogers
 Criminal Justice (2008) – Rogers
 Holby City (2010) – Glyn Hibbert
 Silk (2012) – DS Roger Berwick
 Big Bad World (2013) – Graham
 Whitechapel (2013) – Sid Walden
 The Escape Artist (2013) – Mr. Hughes
 The Increasingly Poor Decisions of Todd Margaret (2016) – Helicopter Pilot
 Witless (2016) – Sergeant Forrest
 Victoria (2016) – Police Inspector
 Rillington Place (2016) – DCI Griffin
 Life After Life (2022) - Dr Kellet

Personal life
Hodgkinson is based in Tottenham, North London, and is married with two sons and a whippet. He is a member of the Equity trade union, and is a 'highly skilled' cricketer.

References

External links
 

1966 births
English male television actors
Living people
People from Surbiton
English male film actors
Male actors from London
People educated at Tiffin School